Futuropolis is a 1984 American short animated/stop motion science fiction film written and directed by Steve Segal and Phil Trumbo. The film introduces Tom Campagnoli, Mike Cody, Stan Garth, Catherine Schultz and Cassandra Cossitt in lead roles.

Plot 
Space cadets Captain Garth (Stan Garth), Spud (Kirk Condyles), Lieutenant Luna (Catherine Schultz) and Cosmo (Tom Campagnoli) investigate the chaos unleashed by Lord Egghead (Mike Cody)'s "mutation ray."

Cast 
 Tom Campagnoli as Cosmo
 Mike Cody as Egghead
 Stan Garth as Captain Garth
 Catherine Schultz as Lieutenant Luna 
 Cassandra Cossitt as 2nd Lieutenant
 Kirk Condyles as Spud
 Bud Webster as Guard
 Mary Pat Jimenez as Dispatcher
 Steve Segal as Muctu
 Phil Trumbo as Guard

Production 
The film is shot at Hoey/Silverman, Monument Avenue Association, Richmond Parks Recreation & Schools, Hollywood Cemetery and Skillygalley Restaurant, while the studios were provided by Alpha Recording Corp. and Science Museum of Virginia. The computer programming was made by Kermit Woodall and Steve Segal using Commodore 64.

Reception 
As of November 11, 2002, the film held a score of 7,7 out of 10 by one user on IMDb. Janet Maslin of The New York Times and Peter Reiher also rated this film.

External links 
 
 
 

1984 films
American animated short films
1980s science fiction films
American science fiction films
1980s English-language films
1980s American films